Maayan Davidovich (born May 21, 1988) is an Israeli Olympic windsurfer.

Biography
Davidovich is Jewish, and her hometown is Herzliya, Israel.  She competes with the club Hapoel Tel Aviv.

She started sailing at the age of five, and surfing at 13. Her parents enjoy watersports, and her brothers and twin sister were all windsurfing champions. She made her international competitive debut in the 1999 Optimist European Championships, in Greece.

In July 2005, she came in fourth in the Mistral – Women 35th Volvo Youth Sailing International Sailing Federation (ISAF) World Championship, in Busan, Korea.  In July 2006, she won a silver medal at the RS:X – Women Volvo Youth Sailing ISAF World Championship, in Weymouth, Great Britain.  In 2007, she finished 15th in the European Championships.

She competed on behalf of Israel at the 2008 Summer Olympics at the age of 19 in Beijing, China, in the women's sailboard windsurfing event, and came in 10th.

In June 2009, she came in seventh in the RS:X – Women European Championship, in Tel Aviv, Israel.  In May 2011, she came in fourth in the RS:X – Women Delta Lloyd Regatta, in Medemblik, The Netherlands.

In both 2013 (when she was ranked 10th in the world in December) and 2014 (when she was ranked 14th in the world), she was the ISAF Worlds RS:X bronze medalist.

She represented Israel at the 2016 Summer Olympics, coming in 7th place in the RS:X.

References

External links
 

1988 births
Living people
Israeli windsurfers
Sailors at the 2008 Summer Olympics – RS:X
Sailors at the 2016 Summer Olympics – RS:X
Olympic sailors of Israel
Israeli female sailors (sport)
Jewish sailors (sport)
Israeli Jews
People from Herzliya
Israeli twins
Twin sportspeople
Female windsurfers